Georges Hellebuyck (21 August 1890 – 20 February 1975) was a Belgian sailor who competed in the 1920 Summer Olympics. He was a crew member of the Belgian boat Antwerpia V, which won the bronze medal in the 8 metre class (1919 rating).

References

External links
profile

1890 births
1975 deaths
Belgian male sailors (sport)
Sailors at the 1920 Summer Olympics – 8 Metre
Olympic sailors of Belgium
Olympic bronze medalists for Belgium
Olympic medalists in sailing
Medalists at the 1920 Summer Olympics
20th-century Belgian people